Dutch Australians refers to Australians of Dutch ancestry. They form one of the largest groups of the Dutch diaspora outside Europe. At the 2021 census, 381,946 people nominated Dutch ancestry (whether alone or in combination with another ancestry), representing 1.5% of the Australian population. At the 2021 census, there were 66,481 Australian residents who were born in the Netherlands.

History

Early history
The history of the Dutch and Australia began  with Captain Willem Janszoon, a Dutch seafarer, who was the first European to land on Australian soil in 1606.

The Dutch East Indies Company (VOC) had its headquarters in the Far East in Batavia (modern-day Jakarta) from 1619, but traded from many Asian harbours from 1602. The journey from the Netherlands to the Dutch East Indies would take more than a year by traditional route, but after the discovery of the Roaring Forties by Dutch captain Hendrick Brouwer, who established the so-called Brouwer Route in 1611 the voyage would be cut short by months, taking a trajectory along the southern latitudes of the Indian Ocean. By 1617 all VOC ships were ordered to take this route. The navigation technique of that time, known as dead reckoning, caused some ships to travel too far east so they sighted the Australian west coast, and a small number of them were wrecked there. Dirk Hartog made the first European landing of the Australian west coast with a pewter plate in 1616. Known ships wrecked off that include the Batavia, the Vergulde Dreak, the Zuytdorp and  the Zeewijk.  The wreck of the Batavia on Houtman Abrolhos during her maiden voyage, turned into a bloody mutiny led by Jeronimus Corneliszoon after the survivors had landed on an island and Commander Pelsaert had left to get help. The most famous Dutch seafarer to explore the Australian coasts is Abel Tasman, who was the first to circumvigate the continent in 1642–3. He established that the land was not the gigantic legendary southern continent that included the South Pole and he named it New Holland. Tasmania which Tasman had named Van Diemens Land and the Tasman Sea were eventually named after him. Most of the Australian coastline was first charted by VOC mariners, excluding the east coast and the eastern part of the south coast. The continent would be renamed "Australia" in the 19th century.

20th century

A number of people from the Dutch East Indies (present-day Indonesia) found their way to Australia during World War II and joined Allied forces in the fight against the Japanese. The Dutch East Indies government operated from Australia during the war. Free Dutch Submarines operated out of Fremantle after the invasion of Java. The joint No. 18 and No. 120 RAAF squadrons formed at Canberra, and was a combined Dutch and Australian Squadron. It used B-25 Mitchell bombers, supplied by the Dutch Government before the war. The Netherlands East Indies Forces Intelligence Service (NEFIS) was based in Melbourne during the war.

Post-war settlers in Australia arrived as part of Australia's assisted migration program. Many arrived by sea on the MS Johan van Oldenbarnevelt, while others flew with KLM.

Demographics
At the 2021 census, 381,946 people nominated Dutch ancestry (whether alone or in combination with another ancestry), representing 1.5% of the Australian population. At the 2021 census, there were 66,481 Australian residents who were born in the Netherlands.

Notable Dutch Australians

Brendon Ah Chee, Australian rules footballer
Callum Ah Chee, Australian rules footballer
Leila Alcasid, singer and songwriter
Beeb Birtles, musician
Andrew Bolt, political commentator
Dirk Bolt, architect
Stephanie Brantz, sports presenter
Paul Cox, filmmaker
Guillaume Daniel Delprat, GM BHP
Joe de Bruyn
Mitchell Langerak
Chris Vermeulen
Kate Langbroek, broadcaster and comedian
Dick Dusseldorp, filmmaker
John Elferink
Joanna Gash
Kurt Lambeck, geophysicist and glaciologist
Rolf de Heer, filmmaker
Chris Hemsworth, actor
Liam Hemsworth, actor
Annita Keating van Iersel
Hendrik (Hank) Koopman, country music artist
Willy Lust, athlete
Gerlof Mees, ornithologist, curator, and ichthyologist
Dirk Nannes
Jan Ruff O'Herne, human rights activist
Ryan Papenhuyzen, rugby league player
Nonja Peters
Eric Roozendaal
Roy Rene, comedian & vaudevillian
Ben Rutten, Australian rules footballer 
Alexander Smits
Lina Teoh,  model, actress, TV host, former Channel [V] VJ, and former beauty queen (Miss World 1998), born to Dutch mother
Harry Vanda
Richard Vandenberg, Australian rules footballer
Nathan Van Berlo, Australian rules footballer
Timm van der Gugten, cricketer
Paul Vander Haar
Michelle van Eimeren, former beauty queen and former actress and TV host in the Philippines
Dan van Holst Pellekaan - 14th Deputy Premier of South Australia
Alfred van der Poorten, number theorist
Peter van Onselen, author & academic
Bert van Manen
Jan Hendrik Scheltema, artist
Tammy van Wisse
 Tessa van Veenendaal, doctor
Johnny Young
Gus Winckel, military officer and pilot
Richard Woldendorp, photographer
John van Lieshout, Queensland's richest person, from furniture stores and real estate development

See also
 
 Australia–Netherlands relations
 Immigration history of Australia
 Belgian Australians
 Danish Australians
 German Australians
 Icelandic Australians
 Norwegian Australians
 Swedish Australians

References

Further reading

 Bureau of Immigration Research (1991) Community profiles, Netherlands born Canberra: Australian Government Publishing Service. 
 Duyker, E. (1987) The Dutch in Australia Melbourne: AE Press, Australian ethnic heritage series. 
 Duyker, E.; York, B. (1994) Exclusions and admissions: the Dutch in Australia, 1902–1946 Canberra: Centre for Immigration and Multicultural Studies. 
 Eysbertse, D. (1997) Where waters meet: Bonegilla: the Dutch migrant experience North Brighton: Erasmus Foundation. 
 Mencke, A.; Van der Schaaf, T. (1979) The distribution of Dutch immigrants in Australia 1947–1976 Thesis (PhD), University of Groningen
 Peters, N.; Schwarz, N.; Noakes, K. (2003) Transpositions: contextualising recent Dutch Australian art Perth: Art on the Move. 
 Peters, N. (2006) The Dutch Down Under, 1606–2006 Crawley, W.A.: University of Western Australia Press. 
 Schindlmayr, T. (2000) 1996 census: Netherlands born Dept. of Immigration and Multicultural Affairs, Statistics Section. 
 Zierke, E.; Smid, M.; Snelleman, P. (1997) Old ties, new beginnings: Dutch women in Australia Carrum Downs, Vic. Dutch Care Ltd.

External links
 Netherlands–Australia, 1606–2006
 Dutch in Australia at the Australian War Memorial
 Dutch Club in South Australia

 
Australia
European Australian
Immigration to Australia